"Can't Hold Back" is the third single released by Australian singer Kaz James, taken from his 2008 debut solo album, If They Knew. It is the singer's first solo top 50 single in Australia. Macy Gray is a featured vocalist on the song.

Music video
A music video was shot and released. James uploaded the video onto his official YouTube channel on 11 January 2009, and it was made available for download on the Australian iTunes Store. It features both Kaz and Macy walking through corridors and standing within elevators. There are other rooms with different coloured backdrops in which both Kaz and Macy stand in front.

Airplay
"Can't Hold Back" first began to receive promotion and airplay in late 2008 on the Nova Network. After its official release, it gained airplay on Today Network stations.

Track listing
Australian CD single
 "Can't Hold Back" – 2:31
 "Can't Hold Back" (instrumental mix) – 2:31

iTunes bonus track
 "We Hold On" (Beaucoup Disco Remix) – 5:39

Charts

Release history

References

2009 singles
Kaz James songs
Macy Gray songs
Songs written by Macy Gray
2008 songs
Sony BMG singles